Selela is an administrative ward in the Monduli District of the Arusha Region of Tanzania. The name Selela means Clean water in the Maasai language.

In 2016 the Tanzania National Bureau of Statistics report there were 9,712 people in the ward, from 8,703 in 2012.

Education
In Selela there are a number of schools: 
- Selela Primary School is the largest and counts almost 1,200 children. . 
- In the subvillage of Mbaash (which means 'between the mountains in Maasai language), about 16 km from Selela, there's also primary school which counts more than 500 children. The head teacher is Mr. Paakwai Meitamei. 
- A third primary school is about 7 km from Selela village and is called Ndinyika Primary School, with more than children. Ndinyika means 'far from the boma' in Maasai language. . 
- Oltinga Secondary School is built on the escarpment and overviews Selela village. This school has almost 400 students from the region around Selela. Head teacher is Mr. Kitally.

Health 
Selela has a dispensary and since 2016 a new dispensary at Mbaash has opened .
Selela and Mbaash are supported by Tanzania Support Foundation. This organization especially helped the Selela schools with several supplies (for example school desks, computers, books, exercise books, storage cupboards, construction materials for classrooms and teachers houses et cetera) and the medical dispensary (for example several medical supplies, wheelchairs, walkers and a solar installation).

Economy
Every Wednesday there's a market day at Selela village. In the village there are some guesthouses and small shops.

References

Monduli District
Wards of Arusha Region